Ischnognatha semiopalina is a moth of the family Erebidae first described by Felder in 1874. It is found in Nicaragua, Brazil and Guyana, French Guiana, Ecuador, Peru and Bolivia.

References

 

Phaegopterina
Moths described in 1874